Hua Chenyu (born February 7, 1990, in Hubei province , China) is a Chinese Pop singer and songwriter. He gained widespread recognition for his music talent, strong vocal ability and stage performance after participating in Singer 2018.  One of the critics from the show states that Hua Chenyu has brought the Chinese pop music to a new level of art after his cover performance of 《Fake Monk》(假行僧).  Many songs he composed contain his thoughts to the world or imply his own story that he would like to share with his fans.  Songs like 《Qi Tian齊天》, 《Madhouse 瘋人院》, 《Seven Personalities 七重人格》, 《Bull Fight 鬥牛》,and more are all stamped with his unique creation and deep messages.  In his 2022 interview with Bazaar Man Magazine,  he states that rock spirit is the base color of this life and is also the root of his music. In a music market  dominated by ballad style of Chinese pop songs, he refuses to be limited and  be defined in a framed genre.

Chenyu became famous after winning the 2013 Super Boy singing contest, which was produced by Hunan TV in China. He released his debut album Quasimodo's Gift on September 18, 2014, which peaked at number one on the Jingdong Top 100 Annual Sales Chart (Music). His first headline concert, "Mars Concert", was held in Beijing on September 6, 2014, before his debut album was released. Over 10,000 tickets were sold out within two minutes, breaking several records and making him the first mainland Chinese singer of his generation to hold concerts in a large arena. Another concert on September 7 was then announced and sold out.

Since then, Hua Chenyu tours his "Mars" Concerts throughout China. His second physical album Aliens was released in December 2015. At a "Mars" concert in 2016, he became the first Chinese singer with the first generation to hold a four-sided concert. On March 7, 2017, he released his third album H, which refers to his family name initial.  On September 8 and 9, 2018, he performed in the Beijing National Stadium in front of 90,000 people each day, becoming the only mainland Chinese singer to perform in this venue successively. His single "I really want to love this world" went on sale digitally on December 4, 2019, selling more than seven million copies and a revenue of over ¥63 millions (US$9.3 million) within six months. His fourth album "New World" went on sale in April 2020. It was sold digitally and as USB and CD; sales of the digital album reached 1.65 million, exceeding ¥33 million (around US$4.8 million) by early August 2020.

Early life 
Hua Chenyu was born to a wealthy family on February 7, 1990, in the city Shiyan, Hubei province. His parents divorced when he was two years old and during his childhood he lived with his father, who remarried when he was ten years old. He began playing the flute at the age of five and took piano lessons in the fifth grade. He wrote his first song at the age of twelve after mastering piano.

After finishing middle school, Hua moved to Wuhan alone to attend the Fine Arts High School there. In 2010, he passed the college entrance examination and entered the Wuhan Conservatory of Music, where he studied pop music vocal performance and became the vocalist of a college rock band called Conseer.

Career

Super Boy
In 2013, shortly before graduating from conservatory, Hua entered the casting for the television talent contest Super Boy, which was produced by Hunan TV. On his first appearance to the audience, he sang his original "Lyricless Song" that gave him the label of being like a "Martian" for his unique expression. Two of the three judges considered him to be odd or crazy, but after the third judge Laure Shang asked him a few questions and sang a lyricless duet with him, she said "he is a genius!" because "he knew intuitively how to express emotions through music". Due to the recommendation of Laure Shang and his performance of "The Kill", Hua made it past the first round of audition. He later sang with Laure Shang the song "The Star" in the final round on September 27, 2013. Chenyu Hua won the 2013 "Super Boy" contest.

After the competition, Hua was signed to the Chinese record labels EE-Media, where the most of the Super Boy and Super Girl contestants are linked. His debut single "Me and Myself" was released in September 2013. Hua also took part in the Super Boy Tour with other contestants, in which they toured eleven major Chinese cities.

2013–2014: First Mars Concert and debut album Quasimodo's Gift 
Chenyu Hua went to Italy and Spain to film for the TVN reality show "Divas Hit the Road" in April 2014 and the show was broadcast from April 25. The first episode received the highest viewership in its broadcast time slot. In June, he was invited by the popular Korean eyewear brand ALO as the first Chinese brand ambassador and went to Korea for the advertising photography.

In less than a year since Hua's debut, he announced his first headlining concert, Mars Concert, in May 2014. On June 28, 2014, over 10,000 concert tickets for his first show on September 6 were sold out in 92 seconds. Due to the massive response, the organizers announced an extra show on September 7. The press conference of the Mars Concert 2014 was held at the Wukesong Arena. This made him the first in the Chinese music industry to hold press conference in a venue with capacity over a thousand. The September 6 concert was broadcast live through QQ Music and Hunantv, attracting more than 400,000 online viewers. Over 120,000 E-tickets were sold.

On the same day of his concert (September 6), the international jewelry brand Pomellato announced Chenyu Hua as the brand ambassador for some of its products. Hua released his first solo album Quasimodo's Gift on September 19, 2014, both in China and overseas. This atypical album has genres including rock, indie and folk. Quasimodo's Gift does not feature songs about love and relationships but uses a first-person perspective to describe the world as Hua sees it. Hua composed three of the ten songs on this album, including the title song "Quasimodo's Gift". A sense of loneliness but not sorrow fills up the whole album. According to Hua, the album's main theme is "small": "At first I wanted to name it Size 40. 40 is my shoe size. I mean everyone doesn't need a vast space to live, as one only have a pair of feet of size 40, and just standing here is enough ... Because as long as you are standing here, you exist, and have a value of existence." – Hua Chenyu.

On November 11, the short film Quasimodo's Gift was released, with Hua as the main character. His songs "Quasimodo's Gift" and "Ashes from the Fireworks" were included in the film, merging the music into the story. The music videos of the songs were cut from this short film. The overseas version of this album ranked number one on the Taiwan Five Music Chart for several weeks. This album received several awards, including ERC Chinese Top Ten Awards for Best Album, Top Chinese Music Awards for 2014 Most Popular Album, Best Album Performance, and Best Album Production, Chinese Music Radio Awards for Best Composition, and Golden Song for the track "Let You Go". This album reached number one on Jingdong's 2014 music sale chart.

In November, he was invited to appear on "Say Hi! The Hit of China", the online variety show of Tencent (Hi歌). In the program, Hua chose to rearrange the song "Spring" and won the "Annual Hit Song of China" (年度Hi歌). On December 24, he sang "Shimmer" and "Quasimodo's Gift" with rearranged piano composition at pianist Langlang's Beijing concert.

2015: Second Album Aliens and Mars Concert 
On January 1, 2015, Chenyu Hua for the first time joined and performed in the Liaoning TV New Year Gala. On January 10, "Shimmer" was announced as the interlude song of the Chinese television drama "You Are My Sunshine" (何以笙箫默). On February 8 (Los Angeles Time zone), Chenyu Hua was invited by Billboard as a VIP spectator to the 57th Annual Grammy Awards. On February 17, he performed in the Liaoning TV Chinese New Year Gala.On April 27, Hua released his vocal experimental song "Cancer". On the Forbes China Celebrity 100 announced on May 11, his song charted for the first time with the integrated ranking of 91.

In early May, Hua's Mars Concert was announced to hold on August 1 in Shanghai. Almost 10,000 tickets were sold out within 35 seconds while over 160,000 people were online. This once again broke the online ticketing record in the Mainland. Due to the heated response, his company announced two extra shows at the same venue, on July 31 and August 2 respectively. It made him the first Mainland singer to hold concert for three consecutive nights in the same venue. His concert on August 1 was broadcast online through Tencent and HunanTV (芒果TV). The Tencent online audience reached 2.64 million. This also renewed the record for online concert real-time broadcast.

On October 28, his second album "Aliens" started pre-ordering on Jingdong. The limited 30,000 release almost sold out within a day. On November 7, his first digital album also started pre-ordering. Within eight minutes, over 100,000 units were sold. The album sold 350,000 copied on the first day of release. On December 18, "Aliens" was released on overseas music platforms including iTunes and the overseas version of "Aliens" was also released on December 22. The promotional video of "Aliens" was aired on the LED screen at New York's Times Square for a week starting from December 23. Hua composed 7 of the 11 songs; for this album, he wanted to present himself as "big" and "domineering", in contrast to his first album. This was also the first time he included rap songs in his album.

Aliens won many awards, including ERC Chinese Top Ten Awards for Best Concept Album, Best Vocal Collaboration for Kings and Paupers, Top Chinese Music Awards for Best Album Performance, 2016 Ali Music Annual Awards for Best Pop Album, Most Popular Album, and Most Popular song for Mayfly.

On November 13, Chenyu Hua joined the television show Be the Idol (唱游天下) which was produced by Jiangsu TV. On December 31, Hua appeared in his third-consecutive Hunan TV New Year Countdown Concert .

2016: The Next 

On January 8, Hua performed in "Langlang's Sky – Langlang and His Friends Spring Music Festival". The show was broadcast by Liaoning TV on February 1. On February 8, he performed "For My Future Child" on Beijing TV Chinese New Year Gala. On March 4, Chenyu Hua appeared as a guest on the variety show "Ace to Ace" (王牌对王牌) on ZhejiangTV. His arrangement of the song "Boluo Boluo Mi" originally by Xie Na (菠萝菠萝蜜) gained widespread attention and positive comments.

On March 7, the interlude song "The Rampage", which appears in the movie Who Sleeps My Bro, was released. On April 7, he released the song "Mars Intelligence Agency", which is the theme song for the online talk show with the same title. On April 9, he participated in the 16th Annual Festival of Top Chinese Music as ambassador and received two awards: Annual Best Album Performance for his album Aliens and Annual Best Idol.

On July 8, Chenyu Hua's newly released song "Here We Are" was announced as the theme song for the movie Line Walker (使徒行者). Another self-composed song "To Be Free" was released on August 3 and it is the promotional song for the movie The Warriors Gate. On August 16, Chenyu Hua released his second English song "For Forever", which was specially created for the Mars Concert.

This year, Hua held concerts in Beijing, Shanghai and Shenzhen. The Beijing Concert was held on July 2 in the Wukesong Culture & Sports Center. Shanghai concerts were held on August 21 in the Mercedes-Benz Arena. The final 2016 Mars Concert took place in Shenzhen Bay Sports Center with Khalil Fong as the special guest. The live online broadcast of the Shanghai and Shenzhen concerts, supported by LeEco, attracted over 4.3 million viewers.

In this program, aspiring singers have the opportunity to challenge a celebrity mentor, who is assigned a song by the challenger and has 24 hours to prepare for the performance. Hua gained widespread recognition for his rearrangement and performance, especially after his own arrangement of 我的滑板鞋 (My Skateboard Shoes), entitled 我的滑板鞋 2016, which was later released on his album H. He won a majority of audience votes with performances of 流浪记 (Wandering), 故乡的云 (Clouds of Hometown), Dear Friend, 齐天大圣 (Great Sage Equal to Heaven, translation may vary) and 易燃易爆炸 (Flammable and Explosive). Hua and contestant  performed 南屏晚钟 (Nanping Evening Bells) in the semi-finals and 如果爱 (Perhaps Love) in the finals.

2017: Studying Abroad, TV Shows, Mars Concert 
After filming The Next, Hua went to study in Berklee College of Music until end of March. He learned singing and rapping skills but found many of the techniques are more suited to English songs than Chinese ones. He also learned how Pentatonic scale is used in Western music (as it was also widely used in traditional Chinese music), and he would incorporate it in his own songs, such as his arrangement of "Drinking Alone"). On June 3, Hua joined television travel show Flowers on Trip (旅途的花样) along with Lin Chi-ling, Zhang Xinyi, Aarif Rahman and others. They traveled to Morocco, Russia, Norway and Denmark, following the "One Belt, One Road" approach.

Chenyu Hua was a judge on Tencent's new singing competition show The Coming One (明日之子), where his support for contestant Hez, a humanoid persona created using augmented reality and singing voice synthesizer technologies, sparked controversy on Chinese social media. The first episode of the show started live-streaming on June 10. On July 13, Hua was announced brand as ambassador of Estee Lauder China.On September 27, the makers of mobile MMO game Kings of Glory (王者荣耀) released its theme song for the in-game character Luban by Hua Chenyu.

The 2017 Mars Concert was held on October 13 and 14 in Beijing. Only one of the concert dates was broadcast live online and it gathered more than four million live viewers. From October 2017 to January 2018, Hua continued his role as a celebrity mentor and judge in the second season of The Next alongside Karen Mok, Fei Yu-Ching, Yang Kun and Jason Zhang.

2018: The Singer, "Bird Nest" Mars Concert 
In February 2018, Hua joined Singer 2018 (歌手2018) alongside acts including Jessie J, Wang Feng, Tengger, Angela Chang, KZ Tandingan after turning down the show for three years. During the show, he won first place in four episodes and his average percentage of votes ranked second among all the previous contestants in the six seasons of Singer. In the final episode, Hua's performance of "Light Years Away"《光年之外》with G.E.M 邓紫棋 brought him to Top Four together with Jessie J, Wang Feng and Tengger. His final performance of Angela Chang's song "Shout"《呐喊》 earned him second place, after Jessie J. Chenyu Hua's performance of his self-written song "Heaven's Equal (齐天)" won Most Popular Song of the show.

That year, Hua composed the track "Halftime (we met here)" for Karen Mok, In May–September 2018, he participated on Tencent's television show "The Coming One 2" (明日之子 2) along with Chris Lee(李宇春), Wu Tsing Fong (吳青峰) and Yang Mi (杨幂) as the mentor for vocal track (魔音赛道). On September 8 and 9, 2018, Chenyu Hua had his 2018 Mars Concert in Beijing National Stadium on his fifth anniversary since debuting. The tickets were once again sold out within one minute, making him the first post-1990s singer in mainland China to hold a concert in the stadium with 90,000 audiences. On December 12, Hua won Musician of the Year at Harper's Bazaar 2018 Men of the Year awards and Most Searched Across Asia at 2018 Yahoo Asia Buzz Awards.

2019: Variety shows, 5 new songs for the 4th album, 2019 Mars Concert 

On January 1, 2019, "Hua Chenyu Studio Official" posted its first weibo announcing the launch of Hua's own studio, which is still under EE-Media but operates independently.

On January 5, it was announced Hua Chenyu would take part in ZheJiang TV's variety show "Ace to Ace S4". On January 13, Hua collaborated with artist and choreographer Shen Wei to perform a show, 声希 (Folding), in Yin 2019 Nanjing Pop-Music Concert (烎2019南京潮音發布夜). On May 21, he announced the 2019 Mars Concert would be held on November 2 in Shenzhen Baoan Stadium. On August 20, he was ranked 33th on Forbes China Celebrity 100 in 2019. On October 22, owing to unavoidable issues, the concerts originally scheduled in Shenzhen were canceled but he also announced he would try hard to arrange the other available stadium and schedule for 2019 Mars Concert as soon as possible.

On October 27, Hua Chenyu announced that 2019 Mars Concert was rescheduled to November 15–17 days at Haikou Wuyuanhe stadium in Hainan. On October 28, "Conversation with ET", which was co-written by Hua Chenyu and ET, was published on NetEase Cloud Music. On November 11, the music video of "Conversation with ET" was published. During the concerts, he released and performed a total of 5 new song composed by himself.. I Really Want to Love This World, Madhouse  were released on Nov. 15 and Nov. 16, 2019 respectively. These two songs plus Conversations with ET released before the concert formed Mars Trilogy. During the concert, Hua Chenyu introduced that these songs were written for the purpose of addressing issues of mental health. God Tree was released and first performed on Nov. 17. He later described that Arrival and God Tree are a pair like Yin and Yang, and they should be played in loops. He first performed Seven Personalities on Nov. 19. He later introduced that Seven Personalities is like a summary of the trilogy.  On December 4, "I Really Want to Love this World" composed by Hua Chenyu, was exclusively published on NetEase Cloud Music.

2020: The 4th Album "New World", Returning to Singer 

On January 1, 2020, Hua Chenyu was the first performer on the concert of HunanTV "2019–2020 New Year's Eve" His airtime saw the TV ratings for HunanTV got to 2.7% while the market share of it has reached up to 30.85%.

On January 3, 2020, he was announced as one of the four returning singers from the fourth to sixth season to participate in Singer 2020: Year of the Hits, the final season in the series. Hua performed mostly self-composed songs, including Seven Personality, a progressive rock he composed, and won the competition on the live finale aired April 24, making Hua the only returning singer to win I Am a Singer.

On May 3, the music video of "Bull Fight", which took six months to finish, was released. Hua collaborated with the Japanese director Mitsunori Yokobori and his team to create this video, which combined the special effects of CG and animation. Hua Chenyu released his fourth album "New World" in April 2020. The physical album was launched as USB format (Mars Deluxe Collection USB Edition) in mainland China. It was also launched on CD format. Although a free version of his live performances on Singer 2020 was already available, sales of the digital album exceeded 1.65 million and garnered ¥33 million (around $4.8 million) by early August 2020. Combined with the previous sales made by his single "I'm Here" released digitally, the total sales exceeded ¥98.6 million. In 2020, He ranked 17th on Forbes China Celebrity 100 list.

2021: Ace VS Ace Season 6, 2021 Mars Concert at Haikou 
On Jan. 29, 2021, Ep1 of Ace VS Ace Season 6 was aired and released on Zhejiang TV. The season had 12 episodes released on a weekly basis which ended on April 16, 2021. Hua Chenyu returned as one of 4 hosts in the Ace Family.

On Nov 26 - Nov 28, and Dec. 3- Dec. 5, Hua Chenyu held a series of six Mars Concerts at Haikou Changying Universal 100 Wonderland. He released a new song at each of the concerts. He introduced that Airplane Mode was inspired by his talk with strangers. Flower in the Small Town was inspired by an important friend's guidance. Black and White Artist was written to address the issues of professional anti-fans. The rest of the three songs forms the Healing Trilogy. I Really Want Myself Back is the Struggling Chapter, Meet When the Flowers Fall is the Hope Chapter and Let's Go Watch the Sunrise Together is the Future Chapter.

Personal life 
Hua Chenyu does not typically discuss his private life in public. However, on January 22, 2021, he publicly acknowledged his daughter he shares with another Chinese pop singer Zhang Bichen.

Discography

Albums

Singles

Tours and concerts

Filmography

Film

Television shows

Awards

 6th Top Chinese Music Chart Break-Through New Artist Award – "Most Popular Male Singer"  (2013) 
 2013 Weibo Awards Ceremony – "Stars of the Year" 
 21st ERC Chinese Top Ten Awards – "Best New Singer" (2014)     
 15th  – "Most Notable Male Singer"(2014)
 2014 Weibo Awards Ceremony – "Spotlight of the Year"
 22nd ERC Chinese Top Ten Awards – "Best Album Performance", "Most Popular Album", "Best Album Production", "People's Choice – Male Singer" (2015)
 15th Top Chinese Music Awards – "Most Popular Male Singer (Mainland)", "Best Album (Mainland) – Quasimodo's Gift" (2015) 
 Chinese Music Radio Awards – "Most Popular New Artist", "Golden Songs – Let You Go", "Best Composer – Quasimodo's Gift" (2015) 
 2015 Weibo Awards Ceremony – "Most Popular Male Musician", "Freshasia Music 2015 Most Wins"
 2016 Ali Music Annual Awards – "Most Popular Artist of the Year, "Most Popular Album of the Year – Aliens", "Most Popular Song of the Year – Mayfly", "Pop Album of the Year (Mandarin) – Aliens" 
 23nd ERC Chinese Top Ten Awards – "Best Concept Album", "Best Vocal Collaboration – Kings and Paupers", "Media Recommendation", "People's Choice – Male Singer" (2016)
 2016 Ku Music Asian Music Awards – "Album of the Year", "Most Influential Singer of the Year"
 16th Top Chinese Music Awards – "Best Album – Aliens" (2016) 
 2016 LeEco Night Awards – "Most Popular Singer" 
 2016 Freshasia Music Awards – "Best Male Singer" 
 18th Mnet Asian Music Awards (MAMA) – "Best Asian Artist – China" (2016)
 2016 Netease Attitude Awards – "Musician with Attitude"
 24th ERC Chinese Top Ten Awards – "Best Adapted Song – My Skateboard Shoes 2016"
 2018 iQiyi All-Star Carnival – "Best Male Singer"
2018 Harper's BAZAAR 2018 Men of the Year awards – Musician of the Year
2018 Yahoo Asia Buzz Awards – Most Searched Across Asia

References

External links 
Official Weibo (Chinese)

1990 births
Living people
Chinese male singer-songwriters
Super Boy contestants
MAMA Award winners